Ansa ja Oiva is a Finnish television series. It first aired on Finnish TV in 1998 and last aired in 2001. Appearances in the series were made by  Juha Veijonen, Heikki Määttänen, Jarmo Koski, Peter Franzén, Erja Manto, Mikko Kivinen, Vesa Vierikko, Heikki Nousiainen, Petteri Summanen, Susanna Haavisto, Tapio Liinoja, Janne Kallioniemi, Kari Väänänen, Susanna Roine, Asko Sarkola, Jussi Lampi, Martti Suosalo, Kai Lehtinen and Antti Pääkkönen.

See also
List of Finnish television series

External links
 

Finnish television shows
1990s Finnish television series
2000s Finnish television series
1998 Finnish television series debuts
2001 Finnish television series endings
Yle original programming